St. Antoine—Westmount and Saint-Antoine—Westmount were federal electoral districts in Quebec, Canada, that were represented in the House of Commons of Canada from 1935 to 1968.

"St. Antoine—Westmount" riding was created in 1933 from parts of St. Antoine riding. It was abolished in 1952 when it was replaced by "Saint-Antoine—Westmount" riding.

Saint-Antoine—Westmount was abolished in 1966 when it was redistributed into Saint-Henri and Westmount ridings.

Members of Parliament

This riding elected the following Members of Parliament:

Election results

St. Antoine—Westmount, 1935–1953

Saint-Antoine—Westmount, 1953–1968

By-election: on Mr. Abbott's acceptance of an office of emolument under the Crown, 1 July 1954

See also 

 List of Canadian federal electoral districts
 Past Canadian electoral districts

External links 

Riding history from the Library of Parliament:
St. Antoine—Westmount (1933-1947)
St. Antoine—Westmount (1947-1952)
Saint-Antoine—Westmount (1952-1966)

Former federal electoral districts of Quebec